Reinhardt Adolfo Fuck (rhyming with "hook") is a Brazilian geologist and professor at the University of Brasília. Fuck specializes on geochronology and petrology, having written extensively on Pre-Cambrian geology.

1969: He graduated from the Escola de Geologia de Porto Alegre (UFRGS) in Brazil.
1973: He got his doctorate in the University of São Paulo in Brazil.
1975: He carried out postdoctoral research in geology and petrology in the Department of Geological Sciences at the University of Durham in England.

His research lines are geochronology, petrology and lithogeochemistry, high-grade metamorphism, greenstone belts, Proterozoic double belts.

He has been an author of a large number of Precambrian-geology-related scientific papers.

In 2010, he was awarded the Brazilian honour called the National Order of Scientific Merit.

References

External links

Brazilian geologists
Living people
Year of birth missing (living people)
University of São Paulo alumni
Alumni of Durham University
Academic staff of the University of Brasília